The Wagoneer and the Grand Wagoneer are full-size SUVs produced by the Jeep division of Stellantis North America. Both vehicles were released in March 2021 and are marketed without the Jeep badge. The models are described as the "premium extension" of the Jeep brand in marketing copy. Production of the 2022 Wagoneer and Grand Wagoneer commenced in the first half of 2021 at Warren Truck Assembly. An electric version of the Wagoneer is expected in 2025.

History

Jeep had been continually attempting to redesign the Wagoneer since the mid 1990s with various proposals. In January 2011, Sergio Marchionne, CEO of Fiat S.p.A. and later Fiat Chrysler Automobiles (FCA), announced at his press conference at the North American International Auto Show in Detroit that the name "Grand Wagoneer" would be relaunched as a new SUV built on the same platform as the Jeep Cherokee and the Dodge Durango. On 2 September, 2013, Chrysler announced that they would delay production until 2015 to allow the Dodge Durango to find an audience but at the same time would use the Grand Wagoneer concept as a basis for a full-size luxury SUV that would compete against the Cadillac Escalade and Lincoln Navigator, whose redesigns went on sale in 2014.

On 9 June, 2015, FCA announced that it would unveil a new version of the full-sized Grand Wagoneer at its dealers' convention on 25 August, 2015. In August 2015, however, FCA announced that the production of the upcoming Grand Cherokee replacement would be delayed into 2018 and was scheduled to be built at Warren Truck Assembly. On 18 October, 2016, Jeep released teaser photos of the Grand Wagoneer, which indicated that it would be based on the third generation Durango and introduced as a 2019 model. The plan was delayed again in March 2017.

On December 5, 2019, spy shots surfaced of FCA testing a Wagoneer using a Ram 1500 body on frame SUV. Due to the 2020 COVID-19 pandemic, FCA delayed the start of production by at least three months and was expected to debut this full-size version in early 2021 as a 2022 model.

On September 3, 2020, Jeep presented the Grand Wagoneer concept, which foreshadowed the next Grand Wagoneer marketed in 2021. The SUV is distinguished by a massive silhouette with oblong headlights and a multi-hole grille. A characteristic feature is the lack of Jeep branded markings on the body and in the passenger compartment in favor of badges with the model name. Production models of the Wagoneer were revealed on March 11, 2021. The first models were expected to ship later in the year, with general dealership availability starting October 2021.

Layout
The standard Wagoneer model is equipped with rear-wheel-drive or an optional four-wheel-drive, while the Grand Wagoneer received four-wheel-drive as standard. The Quadra-Trac full-time four-wheel-drive system is also added to the lineup.

Trims
Both the Wagoneer and the Grand Wagoneer are offered in three trim levels: Series I, Series II, and Series III. Another trim level, Obsidian, is exclusive to the Grand Wagoneer.

Features

The fifth generation UConnect 5 infotainment suite is available in either 10.1" in the Wagoneer or 12" in the Grand Wagoneer, both of which have high resolution displays. Other features include Amazon Alexa, wireless Apple CarPlay, and Android Auto smartphone integration, SiriusXM Satellite Radio with 360L, SiriusXM Travel Link services, and SiriusXM-powered UConnect Guardian. An integrated virtual assistant is also available as an option.

There are two McIntosh premium audio systems available on the Wagoneer and Grand Wagoneer: a 19-speaker system with 950-watt amplifier and 10" subwoofer, and a larger 23-speaker McIntosh system with 1,375-watt amplifier and 12" subwoofer.

Both the Wagoneer and Grand Wagoneer feature several standard screens, with several more screens being available as options. These include a standard digital instrument cluster, a central touchscreen infotainment system, and an interactive front passenger touchscreen display integrated into the woodgrain on the passenger side of the dashboard, and allowing the passenger to stream music wirelessly to the vehicle's audio system via Bluetooth, view the GPS navigation map, and send directions directly to the central touchscreen display. The display features a special coating that is only viewable to the passenger, as not to distract the driver while the vehicle is in motion. Several models also feature a touchscreen control panel for the rear seat climate controls, as well as a dual-screen rear seat entertainment system that allows rear seat passengers to connect their own external devices via HDMI or Bluetooth, connect to the Internet, view entertainment from Amazon, and play integrated games via the seatback-mounted displays.

Wagoneer L and Grand Wagoneer L (2023- )

At the 2022 New York International Auto Show (NYIAS), Jeep unveiled the extended-length 2023 Wagoneer L and Grand Wagoneer L, which are a foot longer than their Wagoneer and Grand Wagoneer counterparts. Trim level and feature content are expected to be the same as the Wagoneer and Grand Wagoneer, although both vehicles will be the first Stellantis vehicles to feature the new 3.0-liter "Hurricane" twin-turbo inline-6 (I6) gasoline engine. In addition, a new Carbide Edition for the Wagoneer and Wagoneer L will be available for the 2023 model year, featuring dark exterior accents.

Engines

Transmission
Stellantis' Torqueflite 8-speed automatic will be the exclusive transmission choice. It is based on the ZF 8HP transmission.

Sales

References

External links

Official website

Wagoneer (WS)
Full-size sport utility vehicles
Luxury sport utility vehicles
Rear-wheel-drive vehicles
All-wheel-drive vehicles
Expanded length sport utility vehicles
Cars introduced in 2021
Motor vehicles manufactured in the United States
Flagship vehicles